Markus Eriksson (born 11 April 1987 in Karlstad, Sweden) is a Swedish curler.

Teams

Personal life
Markus Eriksson is from a family of curlers: one of his brothers is well-known Swedish curler Oskar Eriksson, player om Team Niklas Edin, four-time World champion; another of his brothers is curler Anders Eriksson, .

References

External links
 
 Markus Eriksson | Team Oskar Eriksson

Living people
1987 births
Sportspeople from Karlstad
Swedish male curlers
Swedish curling champions
Universiade medalists in curling
Universiade gold medalists for Sweden
Competitors at the 2013 Winter Universiade